Back to Broadway is the twenty-sixth studio album by American singer Barbra Streisand, released in 1993. The album was Streisand's second collection of songs from Broadway musicals, after  1985's The Broadway Album. It debuted at number 1 on the Billboard 200 chart and gave her the title of "only female artist to have a number one album in four different decades." The album sold 189,000 copies in the first week, and has been certified 2× Platinum by the RIAA, her fifth album to do so. The album was another smash hit for Streisand, also reaching the top 10 in Canada, the UK and Australia.

Track listing

Charts

Weekly charts

Year-end charts

Certifications and sales

Accolades
The album was nominated for two Grammy Awards for:

 Best Traditional Pop Vocal Album
 Best Pop Performance by a Duo or Group with Vocal: "The Music of the Night" (duet with Michael Crawford)

References

Barbra Streisand albums
1993 albums
Columbia Records albums
1988 albums
Albums arranged by Johnny Mandel
Albums produced by David Foster
Albums produced by Andrew Lloyd Webber
Covers albums